Duel of Karate, also known as To Subdue Evil and To Subdue the Devil, is a 1971 Hong Kong martial arts film produced by and directed by Fu Ching-hua and starring Chan Hung-lit and Tien Peng as twin brothers who were separated at a young age after their parents were murdered by the chief antagonist (Yik Yuen).

Plot
Three years ago, Iron Palm School head instructor Lung Shao-kang (Wong Chun) defeats Lei Chi (Yik Yuen) in a duel match. Three years later, Lei murders Lung after extensively training in karate. Lung's twin sons, Wei and Yu, were separated at young age as a result. Yu was adopted by Uncle Wang, a member of the Iron Palm school, while Wei was taken in by Lei. Twenty years later, Yu (Tien Peng) inherits the Iron Palm kung fu from Uncle Wang, while Wei (Chan Hung-lit) becomes Lei's right-hand man, pitting the two brothers against each other on opposite sides.

Cast
Chan Hung-lit as Lung Wei
Tien Peng as Lung Yu
Yik Yuen as Lei Chi
Doris Lung as Hsiao Chun
Sham Suet-chun as Hu Sao
Wong Chun as Lung Shao-Kang
Law Ban as Chung Chuan
Lung Siu
Li Min-lang as Chiao Bun
Shao Luo-huo
Yueh Feng 
Su Chin-lung as Kuan Chi
Kang Ming
Chen Chien-ping as Hu Ta-hsing
Wong Chau-hung
Chiang Tao
Au Lap-po as Fighter in Japanese school
Wu Ling as Mother in opening
Ya Ming as Boy in opening

Crew
Action Director: Yen Yu-lung
Production Manager: Lee Po-tong
Sound Recordist: Kwong Wu
Script Supervisor: Chan Chun-yuk
Lighting: Cheung Tak-yam
Planning: Luo Hai-nan
Makeup: Cheung Pik-yuk
Assistant Director: Lam Kwok-leung
Props: Chang Huan-kon

Production
Duel of Karate was produced by Hong Kong's Lucky Star Films Company, but was filmed on location in Taiwan.

References

External links

To Subdue Evil at Hong Kong Cinemagic

1971 films
1970s action films
1971 martial arts films
Hong Kong action films
Hong Kong martial arts films
Kung fu films
Karate films
1970s Mandarin-language films
Films about twin brothers
Films about adoption
Hong Kong films about revenge
Films shot in Taiwan
1970s Hong Kong films